Nikolovo may refer to:

 In Bulgaria (written in Cyrillic as Николово):
 Nikolovo, Haskovo Province - a village in Haskovo municipality, Haskovo Province
 Nikolovo, Montana Province - a village in Montana municipality, Montana Province
 Nikolovo, Ruse Province - a village in Rousse municipality, Ruse Province